The Green Caesar is a portrait of Gaius Julius Caesar made of green slate kept in the Antikensammlung Berlin, which was probably made in the first century AD.

Description 
The portrait is 41 centimetres high and therefore a little over life size. It is made of green slate rather than the usual marble, but the execution is nevertheless outstandingly good. Signs of old age, like the receding hairline, lines on the forehead and nose, lightly wrinkled cheeks, deep nasolabial folds and crow's feet around the eyes. Lines on the neck result from the incline of the head to the right hand side. The face is long, narrow and angular with marked cheekbones, a high forehead and a strong chin. The long, straight nose, the slight Adam's apple and the narrow-lipped mouth contribute to a lean, even emaciated appearance. The short, curled hair is combed forward from the back, but is merely engraved on the sculpture, not depicted in three dimensions. This increases the sparse appearance of the hair and head. The bust is largely intact, but there are small modern restorations to the seam of the tunic and toga on the right hand side. A gap in the right ear was also repaired at first, but is now once more in a fragmentary condition. The marble inlays in the eyes are modern, as is the podium.

Style 
There is widespread agreement that the individual depicted by the bust is the Roman politician Gaius Julius Caesar, who was one of the most significant figures in the end of the Roman Republic in the first century BC. The only known portraits of him that derive from his lifetime are those on his coins, which are barely idealised and depict him with clearly unique features. They stand entirely in the Republican tradition. All known sculptural portraits were created only after his death. The Green Caesar belongs to a group of late Republican portraits which appear very individualised to the modern viewer, but actually just reproduce various idealised features. These depictions represent values and qualities which were expected of the statesman, using typological forms and normalised formulae. Thus, the signs of old age indicate authority (auctoritas), while the gaze and expression show dignity and strictness (gravitas and severitas) and the tilt of the head shows dynamism and vigour. The viewer sees a serious and dignified man who is fully aware of his position and the duties that go with it, but also of his entitlement to it. The ascetic, sober style imitates the sobriety and endurance of a successful general, even though the clothing is that of a statesman rather than a general.

The actual circumstances of the portrait's creation are unclear. Many archaeologists place it in the first century BC, but the majority prefer the first century AD, in the early Imperial period. It was probably made in Egypt, since the green slate it is made of derives from Upper Egypt. In addition, the engraving of the hair instead of carving it in the round derives from Late Egyptian art, as do the firm, heavy contours of the slate.

Provenance 
Presumably the bust was erected in Rome in ancient times and discovered there in the early modern period. Subsequently it was taken to France and in 1767 it was acquired by Frederick II of Prussia from the collection of Jean de Jullienne in Paris. With other antiquities in the royal possession it was put on display in the Antikensammlung Berlin in the 1820s. There the portrait has been displayed since 2010 in the Altes Museum, immediately next to a portrait of Cleopatra.

Bibliography 

 Max Kunze. "Bildnis des Gaius Julius Caesar." In Die Antikensammlung im Pergamonmuseum und in Charlottenburg. Philipp von Zabern, Mainz 1992, pp. 203–204.
 Dagmar Grassinger: "„Grüner Caesar“." In Staatliche Museen zu Berlin. Die Antikensammlung. Altes Museum. Pergamonmuseum. Philipp von Zabern, Mainz 2007, pp. 120–121.
 Michael Siebler: Römische Kunst. Taschen, Köln 2007, pp. 36–37.

Archaeological discoveries in Italy
Busts in Germany
Busts of Julius Caesar
1st-century Roman sculptures
Slate
Sculptures of men in Germany
Classical sculptures of the Berlin State Museums
Julius Caesar